

England
Squad announced on 9 January 2008, accessed from BBC. Caps updated 10 January 2008 from RFU. On 19 January 2008, Peter Richards was injured playing in a match for London Irish and ruled out of the Six Nations. Due to more injuries in the squad London Irish scrum-half Paul Hodgson, Bath flanker Michael Lipman and Gloucester number eight Luke Narraway were all called up to the squad. On 2 February 2008, in England's opening match, Mike Tindall and Tom Rees were injured and ruled out of the rest of the tournament, while David Strettle is out for four to eight weeks. Because of this Newcastle scrum-half Lee Dickson, London Irish fly-half Shane Geraghty and Sale flanker Magnus Lund were added to the squad. Andrew Sheridan and Phil Vickery were forced to withdraw from England's game against Italy, Bristol's Jason Hobson was called up to the bench as a reserve.

Head Coach: Brian Ashton

France
Initial squad announced on 22 January 2008, accessed from BBC. Changes since then are:
 Before the competition began, Florian Fritz was injured in training on 30 January 2008 and will miss the whole of the Six Nations. David Marty was called up to replace him. Prop Nicolas Mas was also called up to the squad to replace Jean-Baptiste Poux.
 After France's first match, Anthony Floch was called up to the squad because of an injury to Julien Malzieu and Louis Picamoles was also called up in place of Elvis Vermeulen, who was dropped from the squad completely due to a rib injury.
 After France's second match, locks Romain Millo-Chluski and Pascal Papé and fullback Clément Poitrenaud were called up to the squad, in place of Loïc Jacquet, Arnaud Méla and Anthony Floch on 13 February; Floch was re-called after Poitrenaud broke his ankle, and Jean-Baptiste Poux replaced the injured Julien Brugnaut. On 19 February, Millo-Chluski withdrew because of injury and Jérôme Thion was called up as a replacement. Dimitri Yachvili was also called up to the squad when Jean-Baptiste Élissalde was ruled out with a calf injury.
 After France's loss to England in Round 3, coach Marc Lièvremont dropped seven players from his squad—Cédric Heymans, Morgan Parra, Thierry Dusautoir, Lionel Faure, David Marty, David Skrela and William Servat. Five uncapped players were called up for the Italy match: Fabien Barcella, Yann David, Guilhem Guirado, Julien Tomas and Ibrahim Diarra. Julien Malzieu returned to the squad after recovering from his injury, and veteran Yannick Jauzion was recalled. Julien Bonnaire was initially dropped in favour of Imanol Harinordoquy, but returned to the squad after Harinordoquy was ruled out with a muscle tear in an ankle suffered on 23 February. Arnaud Méla was recalled after Papé suffered a knee injury on 1 March.
 For the championship decider against Wales, Lièvremont chose to recall several veterans. David, Diarra, Guirado, Picamoles, Aurélien Rougerie, and Tomas were dropped. Both Élissalde and Vermeulen returned to the squad after recovering from their injuries. Also returning to the squad were Dusautoir, Heymans, Servat, and Skrela.

Head Coach: Marc Lièvremont

Ireland
Squad announced 15 January 2008, accessed from BBC. Cap totals updated 16 January 2008 from IRFU. On 24 January 2008, Jerry Flannery was handed an eight-week suspension for stamping on Julien Bonnaire in a match for Munster, therefore ruling him out of taking any part in the Six Nations. He later appealed against this decision and had his ban reduced to one month, making him available for Ireland's final three games. Gordon D'Arcy broke his right arm in the first half of Ireland's Six Nations opener against Italy on 2 February, ending his Six Nations campaign. On 19 February, Paul O'Connell was named on the bench for Ireland's game against Scotland after making a successful return from a back injury.

Head Coach: Eddie O'Sullivan

Italy
Squad announced 9 January 2008, accessed from BBC. Nick Mallett decided to drop Denis Dallan, Enrico Patrizio, Ludovico Nitoglia, Ramiro Pez, Robert Barbieri and Antonio Pavanello from the original squad, while former captain Marco Bortolami is out for the first half of the tournament with an eye injury. Carlos Nieto missed the game against Ireland because of the death of his father, meaning Lorenzo Cittadini took his place on the bench. He then returned for their match against England. On the announcement of Italy's squad for their game against Wales, Matteo Pratichetti, Kaine Robertson and Pablo Canavosio were ruled out with minor injuries, Enrico Patrizio and Ludovico Nitoglia were recalled due to this. Meanwhile, David Bortolussi was injured in training and ruled out for the rest of the tournament, Paolo Buso took his place in the squad. Also with the return of Marco Bortolami to full fitness, Tommaso Reato lost his place in the squad. But then Ludovico Nitoglia once again lost his place in squad, this time to Alessio Galante

On 27 February, Mauro Bergamasco was handed a 13-week ban for gouging Wales' Lee Byrne during the teams' match.

Head Coach: Nick Mallett

Scotland
Squad announced 8 January 2008, accessed from BBC. Caps updated 17 January 2008 from SRU. After originally being dropped from the squad, hooker Dougie Hall, props Bruce Douglas and Craig Smith and lock Scott Murray were all called up to the squad due to injuries in the main squad.

Head coach: Frank Hadden

Wales
Squad announced 14 January 2008, accessed from BBC. Caps updated 14 January 2008 from WRU. In Wales' opening game of the Six Nations, Alun Wyn Jones was left with an injury to his ankle. For their next game, Warren Gatland called up Cardiff lock Deiniol Jones to cover for him.

Head Coach: Warren Gatland

Notes and references

RBS Six Nations Squad Index

2008
2008 Six Nations Championship